Rice is an unincorporated community in Stevens County, Washington, United States. The Rice ZIP code is 99167.
Rice, Washington was named after William B. Rice after homesteading the area in 1883. His son, Bert William Rice was born in 1886 in the original homestead house. He would live there and farm the land, building two additional homesteads in close proximity for his parents and his growing family of several children with his wife, Ola D. Deakins. One of their children, Pearl Rice was also born in the family home in 1916. She married and lived in the home for 62 years until moving to Spokane Valley, Washington. She married WWII airplane mechanic John V. Ball Sr. According to family, John Ball and Bert Rice dredged a 2-mile long creek, Cheweka Creek from a Spring in the mountains behind Rice Cemetery. The small creek ran through the beautiful gardens of the Rice-Ball homesteads, equipped with a divergent system that allowed the family to use the water for household purposes as well as flood irrigation for the alfalfa fields. In addition to farming, John V. Ball Sr. worked for the Washington State Department of Transportation for 29 years. John and Pearl had three children, Linda, John Jr, and Denny. John V. Ball Jr, born in 1945, recalls attending a two-room school house with outhouses, but attended current-day Eastern Washington University despite his humble upbringings. 
The family homesteads have since been sold, although still stand today. [Information retrieved from familial sources] 

Unincorporated communities in Stevens County, Washington
Unincorporated communities in Washington (state)